Mr. Raden Sastromoeljono (16 October 1898 – 28 June 1956) was a lawyer and the acting mayor of Jakarta. He was a member of the Perhimpoenan Indonesia organization, and in 1945 was appointed as the member Investigating Committee for Preparatory Work for Independence.

Early life 
Sastromoeljono was born as the son of Raden Sastrodihardjo and Raden Ajoe Sastrodihardjo. He was born in Kudus, Central Java on 16 October 1898. He began his education at the ELS (Europese Lagere School) and finished it in 1912. After graduating from the school, he went to study in the Rechtshool (Law School), and graduated in 1918. He went to the Netherlands after graduating from the school to study in the Leiden University. He graduated with a master of law degree in 1922.

Family 
Sastromoeljono was married to Raden Ajoe Sastromoeljono. The marriage resulted in six children, Raden Bambang Oetomo (21 April 1925), Raden Adjeng Sri Oetari (26 October 1926), Raden Adjeng Sri Oetarni (2 July 1928), Raden Adjeng Siti Maryah (28 April 1930), Raden Bambang Oetantyo (4 April 1934), Raden Bambang Oetarjono (15 September 1936), and Raden Roro Sri Boediarti (3 October 1941).

Bibliography

References

1898 births
1956 deaths
BPUPK
People from Kudus Regency
20th-century Indonesian lawyers
Javanese people
Leiden University alumni
Mayors of places in Indonesia
Lawyers from the Dutch East Indies